B80 may refer to:

 B-80, a Zulu-class submarine bought from the Soviets in 1991
 B80, a model of the Beechcraft Queen Air twin-engined light aircraft
 B80, a model of the Rolls-Royce B range engines
 B80, Studley, Warwickshire's postcode district in the B postcode area
 Sicilian Defence, Scheveningen Variation (ECO code: B80), an chess opening that is a line of the Open Sicilian